Jean Paige Turco (born May 17, 1965) is an American actress, best known for her role as April O'Neil in Teenage Mutant Ninja Turtles II: The Secret of the Ooze and Teenage Mutant Ninja Turtles III. Other notable roles include Melanie Cortlandt on the ABC soap opera All My Children, Terri Lowell in the CBS series The Agency, Gail Emory in the CBS series American Gothic and appearances in NYPD Blue, Party of Five and Person of Interest. From 2014 to 2019 she starred as Abigail Griffin in the post-apocalyptic drama series, The 100.

Early life
Turco was born to Joyce Jean (Jodoin) and David Vincent Turco in Boston, Massachusetts. At one year old her mother moved them to Springfield, Massachusetts where she was raised, after the death of her father. She is of Italian, French-Canadian and English ancestry. She took ballet lessons as a little girl and planned to become a classical ballerina. She attended the Walnut Hill School in Natick, Massachusetts graduating in 1983 and performed as a soloist at the New England Dance Conservatory, the Amherst Ballet Theatre Company, and the Western Massachusetts Ballet Company. An ankle injury ended the possibility of professional ballet. She remarked later, "I couldn't even go to the ballet anymore. It was too painful." Turco graduated from Bay Path College in Longmeadow, Massachusetts (1987) and majored in drama at the University of Connecticut.

Career
Turco made her television acting debut in 1987, on the CBS soap opera Guiding Light as Dinah Marler, and appeared on the soap opera All My Children as Melanie Cortlandt. She replaced Judith Hoag in the role of April O'Neil in Teenage Mutant Ninja Turtles II: The Secret of the Ooze (1991) and later in Teenage Mutant Ninja Turtles III (1993). She then starred in a number of small films and returned to TV with a role in the short-lived 1994 NBC primetime soap, Winnetka Road, opposite Catherine Hicks. The following season, Turco starred in another short-lived series, CBS's cult classic American Gothic. She later had recurring roles in NYPD Blue as Officer Abby Sullivan and on Party of Five as Annie Mott, a single mother who is also a recovering alcoholic.  She also played the romantic interest of real-life husband Jason O'Mara in Episode 15 of Life On Mars.

Turco starred in the CBS drama series The Agency as graphic artist Terri Lowell, from 2001 to 2003. She had a recurring role in  the third season of Rescue Me as science teacher Mrs. Nell Turbody, and in 2007 was a regular cast member in the ABC series Big Shots, portraying Lisbeth, the ex-wife of Dylan McDermott's character, Duncan Collinsworth, a cosmetics company CEO. Turco also appeared in the 2006 film  Invincible, playing Carol Vermeil, the wife of Dick Vermeil, and also costarred in the Walt Disney picture The Game Plan (2007). She appeared in multiple episodes of Damages, and guest-starred on The Good Wife, Blue Bloods, and Law & Order: Special Victims Unit.  She also appeared in a recurring role on Person of Interest as Zoe Morgan.

In March 2014, Turco began starring as a series regular in The CW post-apocalyptic drama series, The 100. In the same year, she also was cast as the lead character's wife in CBS's NCIS: New Orleans.

Personal life
Turco is Roman Catholic. She married Irish actor Jason O'Mara in 2003 and they have one child together, David (born in February 2004; named in honor of Turco's father, who died when she was an infant). On June 19, 2017, the couple announced that they had separated on May 1, 2017, and that Turco had filed for divorce. She also sought joint custody of their son David and spousal support.

Filmography

Film

Television

References

External links
 

1965 births
20th-century American actresses
21st-century American actresses
Actors from Springfield, Massachusetts
Actresses from Massachusetts
American film actresses
American people of Italian descent
American people of French-Canadian descent
American people of English descent
American soap opera actresses
American television actresses
Bay Path University alumni
Living people
University of Connecticut alumni
Catholics from Massachusetts